The FIBA U18 African Championship is an under-18 basketball championship in the International Basketball Federation's FIBA Africa zone. The tournament is held biennially. The top two teams qualify directly to the FIBA Under-19 Basketball World Cup.

Summary

 In 2004, a U20 tournament was organized, instead of U18
 The Senegalese Basketball Federation relinquished the 2012 title due to age fraud by some of its players

Medal table

MVP Awards

Participating nations

Under-19 World Cup record

Top Ten FIBA Africa teams
Updated as of 15 December 2022

C Current Africa champion

See also
 FIBA African Championship 
 FIBA U16 African Championship
 FIBA Africa Under-20 Championship

References

External links
 Afrobasket U18 Palmares
 2011 U-18 Championship - africabasket.com

 
Africa
Under-18